Domenico Maria Spinola (Bastia, 1666Bastia, 1743) was the 151st Doge of the Republic of Genoa and king of Corsica.

Biography 
The Grand Council of 29 January 1732 elected him the new doge of the Republic of Genoa, the one hundred and sixth in biennial succession and the one hundred and fifty-first in republican history. As doge he was also invested with the related biennial office of the king of Corsica.

See also 
 Republic of Genoa
 Doge of Genoa

References 

18th-century Doges of Genoa
1666 births
1743 deaths